Ian Carr (21 April 1933 – 25 February 2009) was a Scottish jazz musician, composer, writer, and educator. Carr performed and recorded with the Rendell-Carr quintet and jazz-fusion band Nucleus, and was an associate professor at the Guildhall School of Music and Drama in London. He also wrote biographies of musicians Keith Jarrett and Miles Davis.

Early years
Ian Henry Randall Carr was born in Dumfries, Scotland, the elder brother of Mike Carr. From 1952 to 1956, Carr attended King's College, now Newcastle University, where he read English Literature, followed by a diploma in education.

Musical career
At the age of 17, Carr started to teach himself trumpet. After university he joined his brother in a Newcastle band, the EmCee Five, from 1960 to 1962, before moving to London, where he became co-leader with Don Rendell of the Rendell–Carr quintet (1963–69). In its six years, the group (including pianist Michael Garrick, bassist Dave Green, and drummer Trevor Tomkins) made five albums for EMI – all of which have been re-issued – and performed internationally.  During the 1960s he also played with the New Jazz Orchestra under the direction of Neil Ardley and recorded an album with altoist Joe Harriott.

After leaving the quintet, Carr went on to form the ground-breaking jazz-rock band Nucleus. This led to the release of 12 albums (some under the band's name, some under Carr's), and a successful international career. In their first year Nucleus won first prize at the Montreux Jazz Festival, released their first album, Elastic Rock, and performed at both the Newport Jazz Festival and the Village Gate jazz club. Carr also played with the United Jazz + Rock Ensemble from 1975.

Carr worked as a session musician in non-jazz contexts, with Nico, No-Man, Faultline, and others. He also doubled on flugelhorn.

Writing and academic career
Apart from writing a regular column for the BBC Music Magazine, Carr wrote biographies of the jazz musicians Keith Jarrett and Miles Davis. Carr was also the co-author of the reference work The Rough Guide to Jazz, which has passed through four editions from 1994 (originally Jazz, The Essential Companion, 1988). In addition he contributed sleeve notes for the albums of other musicians (e.g. Indo-Jazz Fusions by Joe Harriott and John Mayer).

In 1987, Carr was appointed associate professor at the Guildhall School of Music and Drama in London, where he taught composition and performance, especially improvisation. He was founder of the jazz workshop at the Interchange arts scheme, where pianist Julian Joseph, among others, was one of his students.

Death
Ian Carr died aged 75 on 25 February 2009, having suffered from Alzheimer's disease. A memorial service was held at Golders Green Crematorium in London the following month. In addition to fellow Nucleus member Geoff Castle, speakers at the service included artist Gerald Laing, author, critic and broadcaster Alyn Shipton, Mike Dibb (with whom Carr collaborated on two films on Miles Davis and Keith Jarrett) and Carr's students Julian Joseph, Sara Dillon and Nikki Yeoh.

Discography

Emcee Five
1961: Let's Take Five
1962: Bebop from the East Coast

Rendell–Carr Quintet
1964: Shades of Blue
1965: Live in London
1966: Dusk Fire
1966: Live at the Union
1968: Live from the Antibes Jazz Festival (plus 1964 recordings by the Don Rendell Four and Five)
1968: Phase III
1969: Change Is
1969: "Live"

with the New Jazz Orchestra
1965: Western Reunion
1966: Le Dejeuner sur L'Herbe

with the Joe Harriott / Amancio D'Silva Quartet
1969: Hum-Dono

Springboard
1969: Springboard (recorded in 1966)

Nucleus
1970: Elastic Rock
1971: We'll Talk about It Later
1971: Solar Plexus (released as a "Ian Carr with Nucleus" album)
1973: Labyrinth (released as a "Ian Carr with Nucleus" album)
1973: Roots (released as a "Ian Carr's Nucleus" album)
1974: Under the Sun
1975: Snakehips Etcetera
1975: Alleycat
1976: Direct Hits (compilation) (released as a "Ian Carr's Nucleus" album)
1977: In Flagranti Delicto (released as a "Ian Carr's Nucleus" album)
1979: Out of the Long Dark (released as a "Ian Carr's Nucleus" album)
1980: Awakening (released as a "Ian Carr's Nucleus" album)
1985: Live at the Theaterhaus (released as a "Ian Carr's Nucleus" album)
2003: Live in Bremen (recorded 1971) 
2003: The Pretty Redhead (recorded 1971 and 1982) 
2006: Hemispheres (recorded live 1970 & 1971) 
2006: UK Tour '76 (recorded live in 1976 at Loughborough University) 
2009: Live in Europe 1970-71 (recorded live 1970 & 1971)
2014: Nucleus With Leon Thomas - Live 1970 (recorded live Montreux Jazz Festival)
2015: Three of a Kind (three archive recordings from the 1970s and 1980s)

Tribute
1973:Mike Taylor Remembered, a tribute to Mike Taylor with Jon Hiseman, Ian Carr, Barbara Thompson, and others.  (released 2007)

Solo
1972: Belladonna
1989: Old Heartland

with Don Rendell
2001: Reunion

As co-leader
1971: Greek Variations & Other Aegean Exercises (with Neil Ardley & Don Rendell)
1974: Will Power (with Neil Ardley, Mike Gibbs, and Stan Tracey)
1980: Collana Jazz 80" (with the Algemona Quartetto)
1991: Virtual Realities (Zyklus, with Warren Greveson, Neil Ardley and John L. Walters)
1993: Sounds and Sweet Airs (That Give Delight and Hurt Not) (with John Taylor)

As sideman
1965: Roy Budd (Roy Budd, piano; Dick Morrissey, tenor sax; Trevor Tomkins, drums; Ian Carr, trumpet and Harry South, arranger)

with George Russell's Living Time Orchestra
1989: The London Concert (George Russell, composer/leader)

Publications
1982: Miles Davis (Quartet / William Morrow & Co.)  / 
1988: Jazz: The Essential Companion with Digby Fairweather & Brian Priestley (Paladin Books) 
1991: Keith Jarrett: The Man and His Music (Grafton Books) 
1999: Miles Davis: The Definitive Biography (Thunder's Mouth Press) 
2004: The Rough Guide to Jazz with Digby Fairweather & Brian Priestley (3rd edn) Rough Guides Limited. 
2008: Music Outside: Contemporary Jazz in Britain, 2nd edn., with new postscript and photographs (London: Northway Publications).  (1st edn published 1973 by Latimer New Dimensions. ).

References

Bibliography
Roger Farbey, Elastic Dream: The Music of Ian Carr – A Critical Discography, 2nd Revised Edition, 2015.
Roger Farbey, The Music of Ian Carr – A Critical Discography, 2010.
Alyn Shipton, Out of the Long Dark: The Life of Ian Carr, 2006

External links
The Ian Carr and Nucleus Website
Ian Carr / The Don Rendell / Ian Carr Quintet / Nucleus discographies at Discogs
Roger Farbey, Ian Carr: The Maestro and His Music – AllAboutJazz.com 7 July 2005
John Kelman, Ian Carr and Nucleus: '70s British Jazz Rock Progenitors, 19 January 2004 – AllAboutJazz.com
Ian Carr biographical sketch – European Jazz Network
Ian Carr – Jazzscript

20th-century British male musicians
20th-century jazz composers
20th-century trumpeters
1933 births
2009 deaths
Academics of the Guildhall School of Music and Drama
Alumni of Newcastle University
Centipede (band) members
Jazz-rock trumpeters
Male jazz composers
Male trumpeters
New Jazz Orchestra members
Nucleus (band) members
People educated at Barnard Castle School
People from Dumfries
Scottish jazz composers
Scottish jazz trumpeters
United Jazz + Rock Ensemble members